Courtney Lee Enders (born November 14, 1986) is a former NHRA drag racer.

Personal life
Enders is the younger sister of drag racer and four-time (2014, 2015, 2019, 2020) NHRA Pro Stock drag racing champion Erica Enders. She attended Cypress Springs High School and drove a Jr. Dragster with her sister, Erica.

Film
In 2003, Enders and her sister Erica had their life story turned into the Disney Channel Original Movie Right on Track. Courtney was portrayed by Brie Larson, while Erica was portrayed by Beverley Mitchell.

References

1986 births
Living people
Racing drivers from Houston
Female dragster drivers
American female racing drivers
21st-century American women